Li Zhuangfei (born 24 January 1988 in Zibo) is a Chinese football player.

Club career
Li Zhuangfei began his football career playing for the various Shandong Luneng youth teams and showed great potential by being called up for the Chinese U-17 team that won the 2004 AFC U-17 Championship. Li, however, struggled to break into the Shandong senior team and was instead loaned out to the newly promoted top-tier side Xiamen Lanshi in 2006. He made his league debut for Xiamen on March 18, 2006, against Shanghai Shenhua in a 2-2 draw where he came on as a substitute for Zou Yougen. After the game Li gradually became the first-choice defensive midfielder in the team, and the club's manager Gao Hongbo hailed him as the most promising Chinese star among his age.

After his loan period with Xiamen ended Li joined top-tier side Wuhan Guanggu on a deal that brought him to Wuhan with several other Shandong Luneng players that included Ren Yongshun, Guo Mingyue and Deng Xiaofei. However, due to some bad relationship with local players, most Shandong players in the team were purged at the end of the season except Deng Xiaofei.

He transferred to second-tier club Jiangsu Sainty in the 2008 league season where he was awarded No.10 jersey and played in six games and scored one goal to help aid Jiangsu to the division title as well as promotion to the top tier. Within the top tier Li saw even less playing time and only made one appearance throughout the season as the club finished in mid-table. This saw Li decide to move to top-tier club Qingdao Jonoon half-way through the 2010 league season where he made his debut for the club in a league game on July 18, 2010, against Changsha Ginde, which ended in a 2-0 victory for Qingdao.

In 2010, Li signed for Qingdao Jonoon. Li was loaned to China League One side Yunan Lijiang for half season on 10 July 2017.

In February 2018, Li transferred to League Two side Zibo Sunday.

National team
Li was the captain of China U-17 National Team compete in the 2005 FIFA U-17 World Championship.

Career statistics 
Statistics accurate as of match played 31 December 2020.

Honours

Club
Jiangsu Sainty
China League One: 2008

International
China U-17
 AFC U-17 Championship: 2004

References

External links
Player stats at Sohu.com
Player profile at Jiangsu Sainty website

1988 births
Living people
Sportspeople from Zibo
Chinese footballers
Footballers from Shandong
Shandong Taishan F.C. players
Xiamen Blue Lions players
Wuhan Guanggu players
Jiangsu F.C. players
Qingdao Hainiu F.C. (1990) players
Yunnan Flying Tigers F.C. players
Chinese Super League players
China League One players
Association football defenders
Association football midfielders
21st-century Chinese people